Dr Edward Stevens FRSE (February 21, 1754 – September 26, 1834) was an American physician and diplomat. He was a close friend of American soldier and statesman Alexander Hamilton. Stevens' date of birth was unclear due to lack of records, with the year 1752 being published by Kristian Caroe, without sources, in his 1905 book Den danske lægestand, 1479-1900 until historian Michael E. Newton published contemporary records establishing Stevens birthplace and date.

Early life
Stevens was born in Antigua on February 21, 1754. Stevens's father, a Scottish merchant named Thomas Stevens who was the landlord of Rachel Fawcette, Hamilton's mother, would later become the adoptive father of the orphaned Alexander Hamilton. Stevens was one of five children. He quickly became good friends with his adopted brother Hamilton, displaying many similar mannerisms. Both were interested in classics, spoke French fluently, opposed slavery, were interested in medicine, and were considered clever.

Contemporaries would often remark that Edward Stevens and Hamilton looked very much alike. Secretary of State Timothy Pickering, who knew both men in adulthood, noted that the men were strikingly similar in appearance and concluded that they must be biological brothers. Hamilton biographer Ron Chernow says many aspects of Hamilton's biography make more sense given Stevens's paternity. It would explain why Hamilton was adopted into the Stevens family while his older brother, James, apparently was not. It may have also been a factor in Hamilton's acknowledged father abandoning his family. However, this speculation, mostly based on Pickering's comments on the resemblance between the two men, has always been vague and unsupported. Rachel Faucette had been living on St. Kitts and Nevis for years at the time when Alexander was conceived, while Thomas Stevens lived on Antigua and St. Croix and James Hamilton Sr never disavowed his paternity, signing his letters to Alexander even in later years ”your very affectionate Father”. Moreover, William Cissel historian and N.P.S. Christiansted Historic Site Director did find possible evidence that Thomas Stevens did initially take both Hamilton boys in, not just Alexander, as in 1769 the registers read that the household had two “white male servants” that hadn't been listed before. By the 1772 register the “white male servants” are gone: Hamilton may have been upgraded and James Jr., who was by then 19 years old, had gone to live elsewhere.

Stevens graduated from King's College in 1774 and then sailed to Britain to study Medicine at the University of Edinburgh. He gained his doctorate (M.D.) on September 12, 1777. Stevens' dissertation on gastric digestion was entitled De alimentorum concoctione. Based on this work, he was the first researcher to isolate human gastric juices. His work confirmed that of René Antoine Ferchault de Réaumur, who showed the digestive power of gastric juices, and helped dispel earlier theories of digestion. Stevens's work on digestion would influence Lazzaro Spallanzani.

Career
On January 20, 1776, Stevens was admitted to the university's Royal Medical Society. He served as the Society's president for the academic year 1779/1780. Stevens conducted experimental inquiry into the color of blood and received a prize for his work. Stevens remained in Edinburgh until 1783 and was one of the joint founders of the Royal Society of Edinburgh in that year.

Stevens returned to St. Croix in 1783. He worked there as a physician for ten years. He maintained his friendship with Hamilton through correspondence. In adulthood, Hamilton tended to shun his turbulent adolescence, and Stevens was the only person from his childhood, including even his closest living family members, with whom he kept in regular contact. Following the death of his wife, Eleanora, in 1792, Stevens decided to move to North America. Stevens had considered a move to Guyana, but William Thornton urged him to choose the United States. Also in 1792, Stevens married Hester Kortright Amory. Stevens ended his ten years of practicing medicine in the Caribbean and moved to Philadelphia in 1793. While in Philadelphia, he engaged in a controversy with Benjamin Rush on methods for treating an outbreak of yellow fever. Alexander Hamilton and his wife Eliza contracted the disease, and Stevens treated them with bark, wine, and cold baths, a regimen that stirred some controversy since Stevens spurned the bloodletting treatment advocated by most doctors including Rush. Upon his recovery, Hamilton became an advocate for Stevens's method. Stevens was admitted to the American Philosophical Society on April 18, 1794. Stevens's work in digestion may have influenced other researchers in Philadelphia, notably John Richardson Young. In 1795, Stevens was appointed as a professor at King's College.

Stevens served as the United States consul-general in Saint-Domingue (later Haiti) from 1799 to 1800. John Adams sent Stevens to Haiti with instructions to establish a relationship with Toussaint Louverture and express support for his regime. The Federalist administration hoped to incite a movement toward Haitian independence, but Louverture maintained a colonial relationship with France. Stevens's title, "consul", suggested a diplomat attached to a country not a colony, reflecting the administration's view of the Haitian situation. Following his arrival in Haiti in April 1799, Stevens succeeded in accomplishing several of his objectives, including: the suppression of privateers operating out of the colony, protections for American lives and property, and right of entry for American vessels. Stevens pushed for similar privileges for the British, who, like the United States (see Quasi-War) were engaged in war with France. Negotiations between Haiti and Britain were difficult given Haiti's fears of Britain's desire to take control of the colony, and Britain's fears of the Haitian slave revolt spreading to its own Caribbean colonies. In fact, Stevens had to serve as the British agent for a time since Haitian troops feared having a British official in the colony.  The convention, signed on June 13, 1799, continued an armistice among the three parties, gave protections to British and American ships from privateers, and allowed American and British ships to enter the colony and engage in free trade. Stevens's correspondence with Timothy Pickering, John Adams, and Thomas Jefferson provide important insight into US geopolitics during the Haitian Revolution.

In 1802 botanist Poit. published Stevensia, which is a genus of flowering plants from Haiti and the Dominican Republic, belonging to the family Rubiaceae and named in Edward Stevens's honour.

Later life
Little is known of Stevens's last years. For two and a half months in 1809-10, during the British occupation of the Danish West Indies, Stevens served as President of St. Croix. He corresponded with David Hosack, including a letter introducing his son in 1823.

References

Sources 
 
 
 
 
 
 
 

1755 births
1834 deaths
People from Saint Croix, U.S. Virgin Islands
Physicians from Philadelphia
Alumni of the University of Edinburgh
Columbia College (New York) alumni
Columbia University faculty
Physicians from the United States Virgin Islands
American diplomats
People of the Haitian Revolution